Bryolawtonia is a monotypic genus of mosses belonging to the family Neckeraceae. It only contains one known species, Bryolawtonia vancouveriensis Norris & Enroth, 1990 

The species of this genus are found in Northern America.

The genus name of Bryolawtonia is in honour of Elva Lawton (1896-1993), who was an American botanist and bryologist.

The genus was circumscribed by Daniel Howard Norris and Johannes Enroth in Bryologist vol.93 (Issue 3) on page 329 in 1990.

References

Neckeraceae
Moss genera